Edward Russell (9 January 1875 – 8 September 1940) was an English cricketer. He played for Essex between 1898 and 1910.

References

External links

1875 births
1940 deaths
English cricketers
Essex cricketers
People from Lewisham
Cricketers from Greater London